The 2018–19 Marquette Golden Eagles men's basketball team represented Marquette University in the 2018–19 NCAA Division I men's basketball season. The Golden Eagles, led by fifth-year head coach Steve Wojciechowski, played their home games for the first time at Fiserv Forum as members of the Big East Conference. They finished the season 24-10, to finish for 2nd place. In the Big East tournament, they defeated St John’s in the Quarterfinals before losing to Seton Hall in the semifinals. They received an at-large bid to the NCAA Tournament where they were upset by Murray State in the First Round.

Previous season
The Golden Eagles finished the 2017–18 season 21–14, 9–9 in Big East play to finish in a tie for sixth place. As the No. 7 seed in the Big East tournament, they defeated DePaul in the first round before losing to eventual tournament champion Villanova in the quarterfinals. They received an at-large bid to the National Invitation Tournament where they defeated Harvard in the first round and Oregon in the second round before losing to Penn State in the quarterfinals.

The season marked the final season for the Eagles at the BMO Harris Bradley Center.

Offseason

Departures

Incoming transfers

2018 recruiting class

Roster

Depth chart

Source:

Schedule and results

|-
!colspan=9 style=| Exhibition

|-
!colspan=9 style=| Non-conference regular season

|-
!colspan=9 style=|Big East regular season

|-
!colspan=9 style=| Big East tournament

|-
!colspan=9 style=|NCAA tournament

Rankings

*AP does not release post-NCAA Tournament rankings^Coaches did not release a Week 2 poll.

References

Marquette Golden Eagles
Marquette Golden Eagles men's basketball seasons
Marquette
Marquette
Marquette